Adam Nussbaum (born November 29, 1955) is an American jazz drummer.

Early life
Nussbaum was born in New York City on November 29, 1955. He grew up in Norwalk, Connecticut, and first played the drums at the age of four. After five years of piano study, he got his first drum set when he was around twelve. He later studied music at the City College of New York, during which time he also played in local clubs.

Later life and career
In 1978 he joined Dave Liebman's quintet and did his first European tour with John Scofield.

Nussbaum played with saxophonist Stan Getz in 1982–83. In 1983 he also became a member of the Gil Evans Orchestra, and toured Europe and Japan with it two years later.

He later joined the Eliane Elias/Randy Brecker Quartet, Gary Burton, and Toots Thielemans. In 1987 he began touring with Michael Brecker's band. During 1992 Nussbaum was part of the Carla Bley Big Band and the previous year John Abercrombie hired him to complete his organ trio.

Nussbaum has kept active in a wide variety of groups and as a freelance. His recording debut as leader was in 2018, with The Lead Belly Project. This quartet album was released by Sunnyside Records.

Discography

As leader
The Lead Belly Project (Sunnyside，2018)

As sideman
With John Abercrombie
 While We're Young (ECM, 1992)
 Speak of the Devil (ECM, 1993)
 Tactics (ECM, 1996)
 Open Land (ECM, 1998)
With Paul Bley
 If We May (SteepleChase, 1993)
With Michael Brecker
 Don't Try This at Home (Impulse!, 1988)
With George Cables
I Mean You (SteepleChase, 1993)
With Ted Curson
 I Heard Mingus (Interplay, 1980)

With Gil Evans
 Live at Sweet Basil (Gramavision, 1984 [1986])
 Live at Sweet Basil Vol. 2 (Gramavision, 1984 [1987])

With Hal Galper
 Ivory Forest (Enja, 1979)
With Mark Isaacs
 Keeping the Standards (Vorticity, 2004)
With Lee Konitz
The New York Album (Soul Note, 1988)
With David Liebman
Doin' It Again (Timeless, 1979)
If They Only Knew (Timeless, 1980)
With Rick Margitza 

 Color (1989, Blue Note)

With Karlheinz Miklin
 Last Waltz (1997)

With Tisziji Munoz
 Visiting This Planet (Anami Music, 1980's)
 Hearing Voices (Anami Music, 1980's)

With John Scofield
 Rough House (Enja, 1978)
 Who's Who? (Jive, 1979)
 Bar Talk (Jive, 1980)
 Shinola (Enja, 1981)
 Out Like a Light (Enja, 1981)

With Ed Summerlin
 Eye on the Future (Ictus, 1999)

With Steve Swallow
 Deconstructed (Xtra Watt, 1996)
 Always Pack Your Uniform on Top (Xtra Watt, 1999)
 Damaged in Transit (Xtra Watt, 2001 [2003])

With Sigurd Ulveseth

 To wisdom, the prize (Taurus Records, 1995)
 Infant eyes (Taurus Records, 1997)
 Wish I knew (Taurus Records, 2001)

With Tom Varner
 Motion/Stillness (Soul Note, 1982)

With Miroslav Vitous
 Universal Syncopations II (ECM, 1995)

Gallery

Web sources

External links
Adam Nussbaum.net

American jazz drummers
City College of New York alumni
Living people
1955 births
Musicians from Norwalk, Connecticut
20th-century American drummers
American male drummers
Jazz musicians from Connecticut
20th-century American male musicians
American male jazz musicians